Let's Learn Japanese is a video-based Japanese language study course for English speakers produced by The Japan Foundation.

The two seasons (Series I and Series II) were originally aired on television at a rate of one episode per day, with each episode consisting of two lessons. Text books which complement the series were also available; these contained vocabulary lists, explanations of grammar, transcriptions of scenes from within the program, and cultural information about Japan. By now, the first book is out of print but the second book is still available from some sources.
Both seasons used a drama called Yan and the Japanese People for instruction. This drama consisted of scenes which focus on the experiences of a young man named Yan (played by Nick Muhrin), a foreigner living and working in Japan.

Let's Learn Japanese Basic I
Series one of Let's Learn Japanese was made in 1984 and 1985. It was presented by Mary Althaus and featured a number of skits, featuring Mine-san (Yusuke Mine), Sugihara-san (Miki Sugihara), and Kaihō-san (Hiroyuki Kaihō), who were designed to help the viewer memorize, and practice the use of, new words and grammatical structures. The series also followed the story of Yan's new life in Japan working as an architect.

Let's Learn Japanese Basic II
Series two was created in 1995 10 years after the end of the first seriesand was presented by Tae Umino. The skits were performed by Andō-san (Seiji Andō), Koyanagi-san (Chinatsu Koyanagi) and Kodama-san (Yorinobu Kodama). In this series the story of Yan is continued (based on Episode 14–26 of the original Drama), only this time it is much darker and more interesting. Yan's heart is torn asunder by the young lady he had a crush on in series one, and he goes to Niigata to drown his sorrows in the wild winter Sea of Japan.

Other series

NHK Let's Learn Japanese Series 
There was also another Japanese language study series named NHK Japanese: how to survive in Japan? which was produced by the Japanese TV Network NHK in 1989. This 40-part series was about David Roberts (ostensibly an American but speaks with an Australian accent) who went to Japan for work. He was assisted by a beautiful girl named Yuko Goto, and in later episodes they are joined by David's wife, Cathy Roberts. David was going to introduce to Japan American culture and food with the American Train.

Erin's Challenge! I can speak Japanese
A fresh start to the Japan Foundation program was the third series, "Erin's Challenge! I can speak Japanese", which aired first in spring 2007 and is also available on DVD and in the form of an interactive website. As it is especially designed for young people it features skits about Senior High School Students which are explained by computer animated figures. The main character Erin is learning Japanese with the help of the teacher Honigon and a small robot called N21-J. Besides the regular skits and explanations, there is also more information about Japan, its students and people around the world who are learning Japanese, too.

Episode list

Let's Learn Japanese Basic I

Let's Learn Japanese Basic II

External links
 Homepage (English) for "Erin's Challenge! I can speak Japanese"
 USN-Page about LLJ; especially interesting for people who want to order the second book
 Homepage of the Japan Foundation, with further information about these and other series & books
 JLPT Matome – All level JLPT Vocabulary, grammar, kanji. Podcasts are also available.

References

Japanese language learning resources
Educational television series